is a Japanese general construction company based in the Chuo ward of Tokyo. The company traces it routes back to 1887, when Nishimoto-Gumi, the predecessor of Mitsui Construction, was established. This company was incorporated in 1941. The current company was formed in 2003 when Mitsui Construction and Sumitomo Construction agreed to merge.  The company is part of the Mitsui Group and Sumitomo Group.

References

External links 

 Sumitomo Mitsui Construction Official Website

Construction and civil engineering companies established in 1887
Mitsui
Mitsui Fudosan
Sumitomo Group
Construction and civil engineering companies of Japan
Construction and civil engineering companies based in Tokyo
Companies listed on the Tokyo Stock Exchange
Japanese companies established in 1887
Japanese brands